Shabtai (formerly known as Eliezer and Chai Society) is a global Jewish leadership society based at Yale University. Shabtai's exclusive membership boasts a diverse group of Yale students, alumni, and current and former faculty. Time magazine has referred to Shabtai as Yale's "modish club du jour" and the campus' "secret society of a different stripe,"  In 2019, Shabtai co-founder and New Jersey Senator Cory Booker ran for President of the United States."

History 
Founded in 1996 by graduate students Ben Karp, Noah Feldman, Cory Booker, and Michael Alexander and Rabbi Shmully Hecht, the society aims to attract Jewish and non-Jewish leaders on Yale's campus in order to create dialogue between various branches of Judaism and between the secular and religious worlds in an intellectual salon setting. The society's Friday night meetings, discussion-based format and ethos of mutual improvement have drawn comparisons to Benjamin Franklin's Junto Club. As one journalist described it, "like Yale's famous secret societies, Shabtai is elite and exclusive, but unlike the infamous Skull & Bones or Scroll & Key or Book & Snake, it is not clandestine." Another described it as facilitating "the kind of conversations around the Shabbat table that bring together secular and sectarian, poor and rich, Muslim and Jew, student and scholar, Mormon and pagan and jock and genius." In 2014, a gift by Benny Shabtai and family facilitated the purchase of the Anderson Mansion, a late-nineteenth century mansion in New Haven's Orange Street Historic District.

Yale 300 

In celebration of Yale's tercentennial in 2001, the society created the Yale 300 project, a series of recorded interviews with 300 prominent Jewish alumni of Yale from various disciplines and walks of life. Participants included Stephen A. Schwarzman, Henry Winkler, Alan Dershowitz, Floyd Abrams, Peter Beinart, Dan Rose, Steven Brill, Susan Crown, Rob Glaser, Paul Goldberger, Jeff Greenfield, Samuel Heyman, Donna Dubinsky, Richard Levin, Robert Pozen, Gideon Rose, Robert Baker, Jonathan F. Rose, Jonathan Rothberg, Joshua Bekenstein, Robert Stern, Stephen Susman, Calvin Trillin, and Wendy Wasserstein, among many others.

Shabtai TV 

After 25 years of operating primarily in private, in 2020 the members launched Shabtai TV in order to share the benefits of its talks and events with a wider audience. The site showcases videos of Shabtai public events and, where discretion permits, excerpts from private talks, dinners and farbrengens.

Social justice activism 
In reflection of its Jewish values, the society has held events to highlight social justice issues and promote interfaith dialogue and connectivity. In 2018, it held a screening of Academy Award-nominated Knife Skills, a film about EDWIN's restaurant in Cleveland, which employs and trains former prisoners to help them readjust and lead successful lives. The screening was attended by New Haven Mayor Toni Harp.

In 2012, the society hosted Israel soldier Gilad Shalit in an event celebrating his release from five years of Hamas captivity the year before. Hundreds of students attended and were addressed by Prof. Charles Hill and dignitaries from the government of Israel.

The society hosted Tony Schwartz, ghostwriter of The Art of the Deal, in 2017 to discuss Donald Trump's psychology, motivations, and character, as observed from shadowing him to write the book.

In November 2018, Shabtai hosted criminal justice reform advocate Anthony Ray Hinton at a Yud Tes Kislev event commemorating the anniversary of the release of Shneur Zalman of Liadi from imprisonment by the tsarist Russian police. Hinton discussed the 30 years he spent on death row in Alabama before being freed by forensic evidence that his court-appointed lawyer had failed to request.

In December 2018, Shabtai hosted attorney Kristen Gibbons Feden to discuss her prosecution of Bill Cosby on charges of rape. Feden said that the success of the prosecution proved that, increasingly "victims of rape and sexual assault can find justice in our legal institutions, as well as society."

Business ethics and leadership and philanthropy 
Corporate leaders lecture regularly at Shabtai in an effort to inspire morals ethics and values in the financial world. These have included Jonathan Klein, Robert Rosenkranz, Robert Reffkin, David Messer, Vivek Ramaswamy, Mark Gerson, Tal Keinan, Michael Shvo, Slava Rubin, David Kramer, Sharif El-Gamal, Michael Steinhardt, Alex Karp, Richard Paul Richman, Emary Aaronson, Jonathan Newhouse, Joseph Cayre, Roman Weil, Arthur J. Mirante II, Elliot Badzin, and Robert Mendy Klein, Brian Kreiter, Jake Katz, Judah Taub, Richard Hurowitz, Scott Shay, Tal Keinan and Vance Serchuk among many others.

Academic and literary fora 
Leading academics, writers and editors of varied disciplines join Shabtai for intimate conversation, often exploring groundbreaking theories and ideas. These have included David Brooks, Timothy Snyder, Anne Applebaum, James Kirchick, Bret Stephens, Bari Weiss, Elizabeth Wurtzel, Leslie Epstein, Dovid Katz, Ed Rothstein, Joshua Safran, Peter Salovey, Adam Gopnik, Joseph Klein, Jeremy England, Eben Alexander, Scott J. Shapiro, Lara Vapnyar, Andre Aciman, Christine Hayes, Kathryn Lofton, Graeme Wood, James Dao, Trish Hall, Stephen Carter, Hal Boyd, Keith Urbahn, Steven B. Smith, Jack Balkin, Laurie R. Santos, Charles Hill, Kate Stith, Louis Begley and Jay Winter, Mark Weitzman, Dave de Jong, Nikolay Kapasov, David Marwell, Joyce Maynard, Jessica Roda, Zvi Kolitz, Sherwin B. Nuland, Nir Navon, Brad Innwood, Will Eisner and Beth Kobliner.

Legal fora and debates 
Contemporary issues facing the Jewish Community and Society at large are often debated at Shabtai with the participation of legal scholars, judges, public intellectuals and critics. Guests have included Richard Goldstone, Guido Calabresi, Danny Julian Boggs, Thomas B. Griffith, José A. Cabranes, Stephen Reinhardt, Alan Dershowitz, Amy Chua and Jed Rubenfeld, Floyd Abrams, Steven D. Ecker, John Durham, Heather Gerken, John Morley, William Kristol, William Schabas, Anne Dailey, Norman Finkelstein, Morris Feldman, Kent Yalowitz, Shaya Rochester, Anthony T. Kronman, Linda Greenhouse, Philip Weiss, Philippe Sands, Oona Hathaway, Jeremy Ben-Ami, and Attorney General William Tong.

Political leadership 
National Political leaders often share intimate conversation and personal reflections of their successes and failures at the Shabtai table. Guests with political careers include Richard Blumenthal, Russ Feingold, Joseph Lieberman, Dannel Malloy, Susan Bysiewicz, Matt Brown, R. James Woolsey, Jr., Toni Harp, Joe Ganim, Josh Mandel, Adam Schiff, Ted Deutch, Nick Muzin, Noah Pollak, Larry Obhof, Joseph Klein and others.

Film and television 
A number of actors, writers, directors, and producers have been known to attend Shabtai to discuss and showcase their work, as well as converse with the Shabtai community, including Charles Grodin, Elliott Gould, Deborah Oppenheimer, Peter Benedek, Lloyd Kaufman, Zvi Howard Rosenman, Peter Rosen, Thomas Lennon, Bruce Cohen, Alan Nierob, Richard Edelman, Bob Bookman and others.

Israel briefings 
Shabtai has deep connections to Israeli political, military, and judicial figures and hosts regular off-the-record meetings and briefings on Israeli developments. Participants, many of whom have also been speakers and guests at Shabtai, include Aharon Barak, Elyakim Rubinstein, Hanan Melcer, Ehud Barak, Yuval Steinitz, Alex Lubotzky, Yoav Gallant, Daniel Taub, Ron Prosor, Danny Dayan, Ido Aharoni, Gideon Meir, and Yaakov Amidror, as well as other individuals like Gilad Shalit.

Global Jewish leadership 
International Jewish leaders meet regularly with Shabtai members to inspire their participation and receive their guidance on critical issues facing global Jewry. These have included Adin Steinsaltz, Ephraim Mirvis, Yanki Tauber, Tzvi Freeman, Emanuel Rackman, Sholom Dovber Lipskar, David Lincoln, James Ponet, Levi and Bassie Shemtov, Jacob Immanuel Schochet, Harry Ballan, Asher and Sarah Esther Crispe, Mark Oppenheimer, Matt Nosanchuk, Yitzchok Kogan, Y.Y. Jacobson, and Faivish Vogel, as well as many others.

Shabtai Global 

In addition to its dinners and events in New Haven, the society hosts regular, intimate discussions in homes of members and friends around the world, in such cities as New York, Los Angeles and Tel Aviv. Attendees are drawn from leaders across industries and professions, as well as artists, public intellectuals, and recent alumni. The society is building a video archive of such discussions to make the insights and ideas shared at such events available to a wider audience.

In Published Works 

In Israeli Ambassador Michael Oren's memoir Ally, he describes Shabtai's role in Richard Goldstone's decision to recant the Goldstone Report, which had alleged that Israel deliberately targeted civilians in the 2009 Gaza War. Goldstone's introspection began after meeting Shabtai's Rabbi Hecht at an event on Yale's campus.

New York Times editor Trish Hall describes being persuaded to attend, and then enjoying, a night with Shabtai in her memoir Writing to Persuade.

A fictionalized version of Shabtai and the Anderson Mansion are featured prominently in the Yale-themed occult novel Ninth House by Leigh Bardugo.

References

External links 
 Shabtai website

Cory Booker
Culture of Yale University
Organizations established in 1996
Student societies in the United States
Jewish organizations based in the United States